Acacia jucunda, commonly known as yetman wattle, is a shrub or tree belonging to the genus Acacia and the subgenus Phyllodineae that is endemic to north eastern Australia and is considered to be endangered in New South Wales.

Description
Like many species of Acacia it has phyllodes rather than true leaves. The evergreen oblanceolate to narrowly oblong-elliptic shaped phyllodes are straight or slightly curved. It blooms between July and September.

Taxonomy
The species was first formally described by the botanists Joseph Maiden and William Blakely in 1927 as part of the work New Queensland Acacias as published in the Proceedings of the Royal Society of Queensland. It was reclassified as Racosperma jucundum in 1987 by Leslie Pedley then transferred back to genus Acacia in 2001.
The specific epithet means lovely and is in references to the flowering display of the plant. It looks quite similar to Acacia podalyriifolia which has phyllodes that are wider and has longer hairs.

Distribution
It is native to an area to southern Queensland extending into northern New South Wales particularly in the Yetman district close to the border of Queensland on the north west slopes of New South Wales. Although reasonably rae in New south Wales it is quite common in Queensland. It is mostly located in dry Eucalyptus sclerophyll woodland communities growing in sandy to sandy-loam soils sandy to sandy-loam soils or among dry ranges in clay-loam to loamy soils.

See also
List of Acacia species

References

jucunda
Flora of Queensland
Flora of New South Wales
Plants described in 1927
Taxa named by William Blakely
Taxa named by Joseph Maiden